Kurts Heinrihs Fridrihsons (German: Kurt Heinrich Friedrichsohn) was a Latvian painter, illustrator and Anti-Soviet dissident of Baltic German origin.

Biography 
Kurts Fridrihsons was born in Riga on September 7, 1911 as a son of a winemaker Johan Fridrihsons and his wife Helena. During First World war his family went to Katerynoslav but returned to Latvia already in 1918. Raised in a German speaking family he graduated Riga City German gymnasium in 1929. He studied architecture at the University of Latvia from 1931 until 1938 however he never graduated. At the same time he took painting lessons at the Vilhelms Purvītis workshop. In 1938 he went to Paris where he studied under André Derain.

From 1938 until 1941 he worked at the foreign literature department of the bookstore Valters un Rapa. During the Second World war unlike the most of Baltic Germans he stayed in Latvia and worked at the Museum of the History of Riga and Navigation. In 1942 he married Zenta Dedze. After a year he was conscripted into Latvian Legion where he served as a war rapporteur. He deserted from the army in October 1944.

After the war he worked as a teacher of painting in the J. Rozentāls Riga Art school until 1948.

During second half of the 1940s, Fridrihsons attended meetings of Latvian intellectuals known as The French group. They discussed about Western mostly French literature. Fridrihsons is remembered as one of the spiritual leaders of the group. In 1951 after discussion about Andre Gide work Retour de l' U.R.S.S 13 of the group members including Fridrihsons were arrested, accused of nationalism and participating in the anti soviet meetings. Fridrihsons was sentenced with 25 years in prison camp and was sent to gulag camp in Omsk Oblast. However he was released in 1956 and returned to Latvia. He was fully rehabilitated in 1991.

In later life Fridrihsons illustrated many books, worked as a stage designer for Daile Theater and painted. He was a member of The Artists Union of Latvia since 1946. In 1989 Fridrihsons was granted title of the Latvian SSR Honoured Art Worker.

Kurts Fridrihsons died in Riga on 31 January 1991. He was buried in the Riga Forest Cemetery.

Art 
Kurts Fridrihsons is known as one of the most exquisite draughtsman in the second half of 20th century Latvia. His most preferred technique was watercolour and later felt-tip pen. Main themes of his art was Latvian folklore, ancient legends, literature and art of the world. In 1960s, he was called an abstractionist. Later he intensified metaphorically imaginative accent, exquisite colouring and elegance of a line. Since 1974 he mostly worked in felt-tip pen technique.

Fridrihsons participated in the exhibitions since 1932, however his first solo exhibition was held in 1939 in Honolulu, United States.

References 

Latvian painters
Artists from Riga
Baltic-German people
1911 births
1991 deaths
Latvian Waffen-SS personnel